Vinda may refer to :

Places and jurisdictions
 Vinda (see), an Ancient city, former bishopric and present Latin Catholic titular see in modern Tunisia
 Vinda (Svalbard), a river in Norway
 Vinda, the Hungarian name for Ghinda village, Bistriţa city, Bistriţa-Năsăud County, Romania

Other uses
 Vinda International, a Chinese paper company
 P.G. Vinda, Indian cinematographer
 Vinda Karandikar (1918–2010), Indian poet and writer